"Prospekt's March/Poppyfields" are two songs by alternative rock band Coldplay that are included on the same track. They were written by all members of the band for their fourth album, Viva la Vida or Death and All His Friends but neither song made it to the final setlist, so they ended up on the Prospekt's March EP. The song "Prospekt's March" is built around acoustic guitars, an atmospheric synthesizer and vocals. The second song, "Poppyfields" is a short instrumental.

Writing and composition
The track has two different songs, like many others on the Viva la Vida album, such as "Lovers in Japan/Reign of Love". "Prospekt's March" is the main song and "Poppyfields" is a short, ambient instrumental piece. The songs are often considered to be a single-song medley as one unit. The band once explained that one of the reasons to put two songs in the same track was to add a bit of value, so it would have "enough value for money".

The name "Poppyfields" was first revealed in September 2007 when Coldplay published a note signed as "Prospekt". The name "Prospekt's March" appeared for the first time in December of the same year, signed by the same pseudonym.

Charts

References

External links

2008 songs
Coldplay songs
Music medleys
Song recordings produced by Brian Eno
Song recordings produced by Markus Dravs
Song recordings produced by Rik Simpson
Songs written by Guy Berryman
Songs written by Jonny Buckland
Songs written by Will Champion
Songs written by Chris Martin